Victoria Gould is a British actress, best known for playing the character of journalist Polly Becker on the BBC television soap opera EastEnders from 1997 to 1998.

Gould moved on to professional theatre work, and is now a member of progressive physical theatre company, Complicite.  She has an MSc in Mathematics; a subject which she often combines into the collective nature of Complicite's work, and is currently based in Brighton.

In 2006, she guest-starred in the Big Finish Productions audio production Sapphire and Steel: The School.

References

External links

Living people
Year of birth missing (living people)
British soap opera actresses
British stage actresses
British voice actresses